Ramabhadra (833–836) was an Indian king , of  Gurjara Pratihara dynasty. According to Jain Prabhavakacarita, Nagabhata II was succeeded by Ramabhadra, sometimes also called Rama or Ramadeva. His mother's name was Istadevi. Ramabhadra had a brief reign of three years. He encountered many difficulties during his reign. From an inscription found at Gwalior, it is known that his empire extended to Gwalior.

References

9th-century Indian monarchs
Pratihara empire